Celso de Freitas (30 August 1912 – 27 August 1970) was a Guyanese cricketer. He played in thirteen first-class matches for British Guiana from 1933 to 1939.

See also
 List of Guyanese representative cricketers

References

External links
 

1912 births
1970 deaths
Guyanese cricketers
Guyana cricketers
Sportspeople from Georgetown, Guyana